Eleusinion was a sanctuary in Athens, Greece, dedicated to Demeter and Kore (Persephone).

The temple was built in the early 5th-century BC. It was located at the base of the Acropolis. Below it was a spring called Enneakrounos (Nine Jets). The building had a size of around 11 x 18m. It contained statues of Demeter and Kore as well as of Iakkhos, a leader of the Eleusinian Mysteries. Close by was another temple of Triptolemus. The Eleusinion played an important role in the Panathenaic festival.  It is known as the place where all sacred objects associated with the Eleusinian Mysteries were kept between ceremonies. It was also there preparations was made for the sacred processions of the Mysteries.

Pausanias describe the sanctuary in the 2nd century:
The Athenians have ... another [harbour] at Phaleron, as I have already stated, and near it is a sanctuary of Demeter." [...] On entering the city [of Athens] there is a building for the preparation of the processions, which are held in some cases every year, in others at longer intervals. Hard by is a temple of Demeter, with images of the goddess herself and of her daughter [Kore], and of Iakkhos [daimon leader of the Eleusinaian Mysteries] holding a torch. [...] [In Athens] is a spring called Enneakrounos (Nine Jets) ... Above the spring are two temples, one to Demeter and Kore (the Maid), while in that of Triptolemos is a statue of him ... After I had intended to go further into this story [of Triptolemos and Demeter], and to describe the contents of the sanctuary at Athens, called the Eleusinion, I was stayed by a vision in a dream. I shall therefore turn to those things it is lawful to write of to all men. In front of this temple, where is also the statue of Triptolemos, is a bronze bull being led as it were to sacrifice. [...] [Near the Akropolis of Athens] there is also a sanctuary of Ge Kourotrophe (Earth Nurse of Youth), and of Demeter Khloe (Green). You can learn all about their names by conversing with the priests.

The sanctuary was closed in the 4th-century during the persecution of pagans in the late Roman Empire. Few excavations has been made of it.

References

Eleusinian Mysteries
Temples in ancient Athens
Temples of Demeter
Temples of Persephone
5th-century BC religious buildings and structures
Destroyed temples